Suraj Tayam (born 4 February 1984) is an Indian cricketer. He made his Twenty20 debut on 15 November 2019, for Arunachal Pradesh in the 2019–20 Syed Mushtaq Ali Trophy. He made his List A debut on 11 December 2021, for Arunachal Pradesh in the 2021–22 Vijay Hazare Trophy. He made his first-class debut on 17 February 2022, for Arunachal Pradesh in the 2021–22 Ranji Trophy.

References

External links
 

1984 births
Living people
Indian cricketers
Arunachal Pradesh cricketers
Place of birth missing (living people)